Dianne Goolkasian Rahbee (born February 9, 1938) is an Armenian-American contemporary classical composer and pedagogue.

Biography 
Rahbee was born and raised in Waltham Massachusetts. Her father, Peter Aharon Goolkasian, was a survivor of the 1915 Armenian genocide.

Rahbee began her early musical training as a pianist with Antoine Louis Moeldner, and continued study at Juilliard School as a piano major.  She continued her work at the Mozarteum University of Salzburg in Salzburg, Austria. She later studied piano with David Saperton in New York and Lily Dumont, Russell Sherman, and Veronica Jochum in Boston.

At age 40, Rahbee began concentrating on composing and produced a large body of works. Her music has been described as "postserial in persuasion", and marries influences of Armenian folk music, neo-tonal musicality and rhythmic drive. Maurice Hinson in Guide To The Pianist’s Repertoire commented that Goolkasian-Rahbee's pedagogical works for piano are among the finest such works.

Rahbee has a rich musical heritage and traces her lineage of piano study directly to Ludwig van Beethoven through Antoine Louis Moeldner. Moeldner studied with Helen Hopekirk and Ignacy Jan Paderewski, who both studied with Theodor Leschetizky. Leschetizky in turn studied with Carl Czerny, who studied with Beethoven himself.

Rahbee lives in Belmont, Massachusetts where she has taught private piano lessons for many years.

Works

Piano 
 Phantasie-Variations Op. 12 (1980)
 Three Preludes Op. 5 (1980)
 Abstracts Op. 7 (1981)
 Intermezzo Op. 18, No. 3 (1983)
 Soliloquies Op. 17 (1983)
 Intermezzo Op. 21, No. 2 (1984)
 Sonata No. 1 Op. 25 (1986)
 Sonata No. 2 Op. 31 (1988)
 Sketch Op. 29 "Harp" (1988)
 Scherzino Op. 32, No. 2 (1989)
 Nocturne Op. 32, No. 1 (1989)
 Novellette Op. 37 (1990)
 Sonatina Op. 41 (1990)
 "Intchu" Op. 54 (1992)
 "Whim" Op. 62 (1994)
 Three Preludes Op. 68 (1994)
 "Twilight" Op. 69 (1995)
 Sonata No. 3 Op. 83 "Odyssey" (1997)
 Three Preludes Op. 87 (1998)
 Three Preludes Op. 88-90 (1998)
 Prelude Op. 94 "Daydream" for Igor Kipnis (1999)
 Phantasie Op. 99 "Y2K" (2000)
 Homage to Shostakovich Op. 106 (2000)
 Ballade Op. 111 (2001)
 Three Preludes Op. 120 "Le retour"; "Ensemble"; "Au revoir" (2002)
 Prelude Op. 122 "Rendezvous" (2002)
 Prelude Op. 123 "Hommage a Ligeti" (2002)
 Two Preludes Op. 125 "Contemplation"; "Rejoicing" (2002)
 Tango Op. 126 (2002) for Diane Andersen
 Sonata No. 4 Op. 128 (2002) for Diane Andersen
 Ballade No. 2 Op. 129 (2002) "Nine Eleven WTC Flashbacks"
 Carousel Op. 131 (2003)
 Monday Morning In The City Op. 132 (2003)
 Adventurous Journey Op. 133 (2003)
 Two Preludes for Mildred Freiberg Op. 138 (2004) "Escape to Inner Space"; "A Vibrant Spirit"
 Two Preludes Op. 140 (2004) "Champagne petillant"; "Imploration"
 Two Bagatelles Op. 142 (2005)
 Finger March Op. 143 (2005) parade for four players (each plays single line)
 "Mystère" Op. 161 (2008)
 Bagatelle Op. 163 (2008)
 "Reflections" Sorrows and Joys Op. 164 (2008)
 "French Suite" Op. 165 (2008)
 A Field of Happy Sunflowers "Zone d’heureux Tournesois" for Eric Hénon
 Motorcycling Through the Beautiful French Country-side “motocyclisme par la campagne francaise” for Nadine Delsaux
 “Chateau de Saint Senoch”
 "Three Close Friends" Op. 182 (2009) trio for three people on one piano

Piano (pedagogical) 
 Essay No. 1 (1972)
 Tarantella (duet) Op. 2 (1972)
 Pictures Op. 3 (1980)
 Five Toccatinas (from Essays Op. 4) (1980)
 Expressions Op. 8 (1981)
 Fragments Op. 14 (1987)
 Seven Little Etudes Op. 74 (1996)
 Seven Small Pieces Op. 105 (2000)
 Children's Album (seven pieces) Op. 107 (2000)
 Teaching Pieces for FJH Collection Op. 146 (2006)
 No. 1 "Sad Story"
 No. 2 "Fooling Around" for Ariella Salehrabi
 No. 3 "Armenian Saga" for Stephanie DerAnanian
 No. 4 "Folk Dance" for Sylvie LeBoeuf
 No. 5 "Jumping Traiads" for Lorenzo Palombi
 No. 6 "The Wild Chase" for Iman and Nora Morlot
 No. 7 "Tricky Triads" for Silvie Lehrer LeBoeuf
 Eastern Tales Op. 144 (2005)
 No. 1 Journey To Where
 No. 2 Little Folk Dance
 No. 3 Georgian Saga
 No. 4 Through the Desert
 Etude in Seconds Op. 149 No. 1 (2006)
 Marathon Race Op. 149 No. 2 (2006)
 Twirling Round and Round Op. 149 No. 3 (2006)
 "Brain Teaser" Octave Displacement Op. 162 (2008)

Two pianos 
 10+10 Op. 48 (1991)
 "Mosaic" Op. 26 (1992)
 Three Preludes Op. 68a (1994)
 Little Suite Op. 72 (1995)
 Triptych Op. 114 (2001)
 Rhapsodie Op. 80a "Urartu" (2001)
 Toccata for Two Pianos Op. 118 (2002)
 Tango Op. 126a (2002) for Diane Andersen
 "Anahid's Musings" Op. 147 (2006) for 2 pianos and percussion
 "Odyssey" Op. 148 (2006) for 2 pianos

Piano and orchestra 
 Rhapsodie Op. 80 "Urartu" 2 piano arr. (1996)
 Concertino Op. 87 2 piano arr. (1997)
 Concerto No. 1 Op. 104 2 piano arr. (2000)
 Concertino No. 2 Op. 113 (2001) with strings and percussion
 Piano Concerto Op. 134 (2003) for Diane Andersen
 Concertino No. 3 Op. 145 (2005) for piano and strings (and opt. percussion)

Organ 
 Rondo Op. 33 (1989)
 Pastorale for Organ and Recorder Op. 71 (1996)
 Three Bagatelles Op. 42 for Organ and Recorder (1997)

Harpsichord 
 Sonatina Op. 41 (1990)
 Two Pieces for Harpsichord and Recorder (Allegretto; Pastorale) Op. 77 (1996)

Violin 
 Solo Violin "Soliloquies" Op. 22 (1983)
 Sonata Breve Op. 50 (1992)

Violin and piano 
 Five Bagatelles Op. 42a (1991)
 Three Reflections Op. 47a (1991)
 Pastorale Op. 71 (1995)
 Four Selected Preludes Op. 92 (1999)
 "A Khodja Tale" Op. 98 (1999) (elementary)
 "Feu Follet" Op. 151b (2007) arr. for violin and piano, poem by Therese Planiol
 "Ses Yeux" Op. 152b (2007) arr. for violin and piano, poem by Therese Planiol
 Prelude "Romance" Op. 154b (2007) arr. for violin and piano (from Op. 120 No. 2)
 Sonata No. 2 Op. 157 (2007) for violin and piano (arr. Piano Sonata No. 2 Op. 31)

Viola 
 "Discourse" Op. 20 (1984)
 "Sonata Breve" Op. 50 with piano (1994)
 Rhapsodie Op. 81 for viola and orchestra (1997)
 "A Khodja Tale” Op. 98 (1999) (elementary)

Cello 
 "Vicissitudes" Second Millennium Op. 97 (1999)

Ensemble

Trios 
 Trio "Shir Ahaba" Op. 28 (1986) for flute, viola and cello
 Suite Op. 45 No. 1-8 (1991) for piano, violin and cello or winds
 Trio Op. 63 viola, cello and piano (1994)
 "Vicissitudes" Second Millennium Op. 97a (1999) for violin, cello and piano
 "Vicissitudes" Second Millennium Op. 97b (1999) for clarinet, cello and piano
 Wedding March Op. 135 (2003) for piano, violin and cello

String quartet 
 Improvisation Op. 6 (1973)
 "Pages from my Diary" Op. 19 (1983)
 String Quartet Op. 57 "Keff" (1992)
 String Quartet Op. 58 "Journey's End" (1993)

String quintet 
 "Journey’s End" Op. 58 (String Quartet & Double Bass)

Sextet 
 "Seeds of Friendship" Op. 111 No. 1, 2 flutes and strings (2001)
 "A Short Burst of Energy" Op. 111 No. 2, 2 flutes and strings (2001)

Orchestra 
 Symphony No. 1 "Kiss of Peace" Op. 38 (1990) (2-2-3-2, 4-2-2-1, timp., perc., str.)
 Elegy Op. 39 (1990) string orchestra
 Tapestries Op. 49 (1991)
 No. 1 "Proclamation" (2-2-2-2, 4-1-3, timp., perc., str.)
 No. 2 (2-2-3-2, 4-2-3, timp.,perc.,str.)
 No. 3 (2 (pic)-2-3-2, 4-2-2-1, timp.,perc.,str.)
 No. 5 (2-2-2-2, 4-2-2, timp., perc.,str.)
 Tone Poem Op. 55 "Sevan" (1992) (2 (picc.)-2-2-2, 4-2-2, timp.,perc., str.)
 Three Statements (1993)
 No. 1 "Keff" Op. 57a
 No. 2 "Journey's End" Op. 58
 No. 3 "Essay" Op. 59 (Strings and percussion)
 "Journey’s End" Op. 58a (full orchestra) (1995)
 Concerto Op. 156 for Mimi Stillman (2007) for flute and orchestra
 Concerto Op. 158 (2007) for violin and orchestra (arr. Concerto Op. 156)

Student orchestra 
 Belmont Suite for Orchestra Op. 86 (1998)
 “Keff” Student Orchestral Ensemble Op. 117 (2001)

Concert band 
 Tapestry No. 3 Op. 49a "Satire" (1992)

Mandoline 
 Bagatelle Op. 27 No. 1 solo (1986)
 "Ariunas" Duo Op. 27 No. 2 mandoline and guitar (1986)

Recorder ensembles 
 Bagatelles Op. 75 for Recorder Trios (1996)
 "Andantino” (descant, treble, bass)
 "Allegretto” (treble, tenor, bass)
 "Barcarolle” (treble, tenor, bass)
 "Giocoso” (treble, tenor, bass)
 "Gioviale” (treble, tenor, bass)
 "Spasso” (treble, tenor, tenor)
 "Pastorale" Op. 71 for Recorder Quartet (descant, treble, tenor, bass) (1996)
 "Giocoso" Op. 75 No. 4 for Recorder Quartet (descant, treble, tenor, bass) (1996)
 "Pastorale" Op. 71 for Recorder Quintet (descant, treble, tenor 1-2, bass) (1996)

Flute 
 Duo Op. 30 (1989)
 Duo Op. 32 (1989)
 Five Bagatelles Op. 42 (1991)
 Flute Trio Op. 18 No. 1 (1991)
 Celebration Op. 56 (1993)
 Two Dialogues Op. 70 flute and viola (1995)
 Pastorale Op. 71 flute and harp (1995)
 Flute Frolic Op. 18 No. 1, flute and piano (1995)
 "Feu Follet" Op. 151a (2007) arr. for flute and piano, poem by Therese Planiol
 "Ses Yeux" Op. 152a (2007) arr. for flute and piano, poem by Therese Planiol
 Prelude "Romance" (from Sonata No. 4) Op. 154 (2007) for flute & piano
 Sonata Op. 155 (2007) for flute and piano

Winds 
 Wind Quartet "Three Fragments" Op. 13 (1981) for flute, oboe, clarinet, and bassoon
 Duo Op. 30 (1989) for 2 flutes, 2 oboes and 2 clarinets
 Duo Op. 32 (1989) for 2 flutes
 Monologue Op. 35 (1989) for flute, oboe or clarinet
 Five Bagatelles Op. 42 (1991)
 Three Reflections Op. 42 (1991) for oboe (or English horn) and piano
 Sonata Op. 139 (2004) for clarinet and piano
 "Mischievous Melange" Op. 150 (2006) 5 flutes, 1 horn, 2 pianos, marimba, 1 viola, 3 cellos
 "Feu Follet" Op. 151c (2007) for oboe and piano, poem by Therese Planiol
 "Ses Yeux" Op. 152c (2007) for oboe and piano, poem by Therese Planiol

Brass 
 Trumpet Fanfare Op. 34 (1987) for 2 or more trumpets
 Trumpet Fanfare Op. 63 (1994) for 4 trumpets
 Brass Ensemble Op. 63a (1994) 2 trumpets, torn, trombone, euphonium, tuba and 3 timpani
 Pastorale Op. 71 (1996) for French horn & piano
 Two Fanfares Op. 91 (1999) for brass quintet
 Fanfare Op. 102 (2000) for brass sextet
 Fanfare Op. 112 (2001) for 3 trumpets and French horn
 Fanfare Op. 119 (2002) for 3 trumpets, 2 horns, trombone and baritone
 Sonata for Trumpet and Piano Op. 127 (2002)
 Fanfare for 25th Anniversary of The Rivers School Op. 130 (2003) 4 trumpets, French horn and trombone
 Fanfare Op. 137 (2004) for brass ensemble
 Fanfare Op. 141 (2005) 2 trumpets, 2 horns, 2 euphoniums
 Meditation Op. 159 (2007) for trombone and piano

Percussion 
 Dance Toccata Op. 43 (1991) for marimba (or vibraphone) and piano
 "Tapa" Op. 44 (1991) for two vibraphones
 "Coalescence" and "Arabesque" Op. 46 (1991) for vibraphone and marimba (3 players)
 "Keff" Op. 52 (1993) for vibraphone, xylophone, glockenspiel, 6 tom toms, woodblock, snare, cymbals and 4 Timpani
 "Gadak" Op. 60 (1993) for ensemble
 "High Time" Op. 61 (1993) for ensemble
 Eight Little Etudes (Suite for Marimba) Op. 95 (1999)
 Toccatina for Marimba and Clarinet Op. 121 (2002)

Voice 
 Song Poems Op.23 (1985) for mezzo-soprano (contralto) and piano, poems by Avedick Issahakian (1891–1957)
 “Like a Rock I Stand Resolute” Op. 114 for bass baritone and piano (translated by E.B. Chrakian)
 One Act Opera Op. 24 Mini Musical Drama (1986) "Did I Tell You What Happened During Our Visit To New York Last Spring?"
 Song of Grief Op. 101 (2000)
 "Robbery" (Break In) A Musical Drama In One Act (1993) for mezzo-soprano and piano, words and poetry by Diana DerHovanessian
 "The Telephone" A Musical Drama In One Act (1994) Mezzo Soprano & piano, words and poetry by Diana DerHovanessian
 "Album", A Musical Drama In One Act for mezzo-soprano and piano, words and poetry by Diana DerHovanessian
 "Praise GOD" Op. 85 (1998) for eight voices
 "Hairenikis" (Armenian Anthem) Op. 40 (1990) for chorus and orchestra; also, for chorus and organ
 Two Song Poems Op. 136 (2003) for mezzo-soprano, viola and piano
 "Feu Follet" Op. 151 (2007) soprano and piano, poem by Therese Planiol
 "Ses Yeux" Op. 152 (2007) soprano and piano, poem by Therese Planiol
 "Infini" Op. 160 (2008) for tenor and piano, poem by Andree Brunin

References 

1938 births
Living people
20th-century classical composers
21st-century classical composers
American women classical composers
American classical composers
American people of Armenian descent
Mozarteum University Salzburg alumni
People from Belmont, Massachusetts
21st-century American composers
20th-century American women musicians
20th-century American composers
21st-century American women musicians
20th-century women composers
21st-century women composers